The 2016 Travelers Curling Club Championship was held from November 23 to 26 at the Kelowna Curling Club in Kelowna, British Columbia.

Men

Teams

Round-robin standings

Pool A

Pool B

Tiebreakers
 10-2 
 6-5

Playoffs

Final
Saturday, November 26, 1:00pm

Women

Teams

Round-robin standings

Pool A

Pool B

Tiebreaker
 6-4

Playoffs

Final
Saturday, November 26, 1:00

References

External links

2016 in Canadian curling
Curling in British Columbia
Travelers Curling Club Championship
Sport in Kelowna
Travelers Curling Club Championship
Canadian Curling Club Championships